The Living Legends of Aviation is an award honoring achievements in the aerospace industry, bestowed by the 130 current title holders and owned and produced by the Kiddie Hawk Air Academy, a non-profit 501(c)(3).  The Living Legends have all made significant contributions to many areas of aviation including: innovators, record breakers, astronauts, aviation entrepreneurs, industry leaders and celebrity pilots.

The 20th Living Legends of Aviation Awards, honoring the best in aviation for 2021-2022, was presented on January 20, 2023, at the Beverly Hilton Hotel in Beverly Hills, California, where they have been held annually since 2007.

History 
Jerry Lips, publisher of Airport Journals, came up with the idea of the Living Legends of Aviation at the time of the death of Michael Chowdry (founder of Atlas Air).  Airport Journals had been collecting and publishing biographies of various aviation personalities and Jerry regretted not having captured Chowdry's history. He began to compile a list of individuals that had made major contributions in the field of aviation, and had those people suggest more names until 70 were collected. These were the biographies that were to be recorded while the individuals were still "living". The list has grown over the years to its present number of 130.  As Legends pass on, they are replaced by new inductees, selected by their fellow Legends.

Jerry Lips founded the Living Legends of Aviation in 2003 with the charter of celebrating the second century of aerospace. In 2008, Kiddie Hawk Air Academy acquired the rights to the organization and annual awards show from previous owner Airport Journals.

Inductees

Past inductees

Event 
Beginning in 2003, an awards show has been organized each year to bring together the Living Legend members for a variety of events.  The awards are presented at a prestigious live ceremony, most commonly in mid January following the relevant calendar year.

In 2003, the first Living Legends of Aviation Awards were presented at a banquet dinner hosted by Airport Journals at the Centennial Airport in Englewood, Colorado. To avoid any weather related issues, in 2006 the venue was moved to Southern California and held at the Hyatt Regency Century Plaza hotel in Los Angeles. Since 2007 the Awards have been presented at The Beverly Hilton in Beverly Hills, California.

In 2018 the inaugural Living Legends of Aviation - Europe event was held on July 26, 2018 at the Scalaria hotel & resort in Salzkammergut, Austria.

In 2021 the awards show was cancelled due to the COVID-19_pandemic.

List of winners

 The award was called the Lifetime Aviation Entrepreneur Award prior to 2018.

 The award was called the Aviation Entrepreneur of the Year Award prior to 2011, and the Aviation Industry Entrepreneur of the Year Award from 2012–2017.

 The award was called the Freedom of Flight Award prior to 2007.

 The award was called the Legends Aviation Legacy Award prior to 2009.

 The award was called the Vertical Flight Hall of Fame Award prior to 2019.

See also
 List of aviation awards
 Oswald Watt Gold Medal
 National Aviation Hall of Fame

References

External links 
 Living Legends of Aviation website
 Living Legends of Aviation Europe website
 Kiddie Hawk Air Academy website 
 Airport Journals website
 Inductee portraits through 2007

Aviation awards
Annual events in Los Angeles County, California